FK Sloboda may refer to:
 FK Sloboda Mrkonjić Grad
 FK Sloboda Mrtvica, Lopare
 FK Sloboda Novi Grad
 FK Sloboda Tuzla
 FK Sloboda Čačak, Čačak
 FK Sloboda Lipe, Lipe
 FK Sloboda Point Sevojno, Užice – former name of FK Sloboda Užice
 FC Sloboda Alexeyevka, Alexeyevka

See also
NK Svoboda (disambiguation)